Veitch is a settlement in the Murray Mallee region of South Australia.

Veitch was named after Mr Veitch, who sunk wells in the area around 1882. The town was surveyed in 1916.

References

Towns in South Australia